Rabīʿah ibn al-Ḥārith (c.566-c.640) was a first cousin and companion of the Islamic prophet Muhammad.

Family
He was a son of Al-Harith ibn Abd al-Muttalib of the Hashim clan of the Quraysh in Mecca.

He married his cousin Umm al-Hakam bint al-Zubayr and they had nine children.
Muhammad.
Abd Allah.
Abbas, He had a son named Abd al-Rahman buried in Ahmed Pur Sial, Jhang.
Abd Allah.
Al-Harith.
Abd Shams.
Abd al-Muttalib, who narrated hadith from Muhammad and settled in Syria.
Umayya.
Another son, variously named Adam, Tammam or Iyas, the victim of the bloodwit case.
Arwa "the Elder", from whom Rabi'ah took his kunya Abu Arwa.

Conversion to Islam
It is said that Rabi'ah did not fight at the Battle of Badr in 624 because he was in Syria at the time.

In 627, at the time of the Battle of the Trench, he converted to Islam and emigrated to Medina.

Bloodwit case
Rabi'ah's son Adam was a small child living with a foster-mother from the Bakr tribe. The Bakr were at war with the Hudhayl. Adam crept out in front of the tents and was caught in the cross-fire of the battle. A rock thrown by a Hudhayl man hit and crushed his head, which killed him.

Rabi'ah intended to demand blood-money or a counter-killing from the Hudhayl for the death of his son. Before this could happen, Muhammad conquered Mecca. On that day Muhammad cancelled all bloodwit debts and he specifically named Rabi'ah's case as the first to be cancelled. However, Ibn Ishaq asserts that the cancellation was declared two years later, at the Farewell Pilgrimage of 632.

All blood shed in the pagan period is to be left unavenged. The first claim on blood I abolish is that of Ibn Rabi'ah ibn al-Harith ibn Abd al-Muttalib. It is the first blood shed in the pagan period which I deal with.

Hence Muhammad prevented Rabi'ah from claiming revenge from the killer.

Later life
Rabī'ah and his brother Abū Sufyān were among the ten people who did not flee in the Battle of Hunayn.

He is involved in the Hadith of the ten promised paradise.

Rabi'ah died after 636 but before 644.

References

External links
http://www.renaissance.com.pk/maprspo98.html

Sahabah hadith narrators